Zhang Song (died January or February 212), courtesy name Ziqiao, was an official and adviser serving under the warlord Liu Zhang during the late Eastern Han dynasty of China.

Life
Zhang Song was from Shu Commandery (蜀郡), which is located within present-day Chengdu, Sichuan. Later, he started his career as an adviser to Liu Zhang, the Governor of Yi Province during the Eastern Han dynasty. His appointment was Aide-de-camp (別駕從事).

During the late 208, Zhang Song's received his first mission when Liu Zhang sends him after his brother Zhang Su (張肅) as an emissary to Cao Cao. At this time, Cao Cao already had conquered the majority of Jing Province and driven off Liu Bei at the battle of Changban and so didn't employ Zhang Song which greatly angered him. The Han Jin Chunqiu (漢晉春秋) add some precision, that when they met, Cao Cao was condescend with Zhang Song and didn't show any interest in him. Because of this attitude, when he returned Zhang Song advised Liu Zhang to cut his relation with Cao Cao.

Following this, Cao Cao lost the battle of Chibi and many of his men died from disease. When Zhang Song returned, he harshly criticized Cao Cao and advised Liu Zhang to sever his relation with Cao Cao unilaterally. However, he encouraged him to establish friendly relation with Liu Bei advocating that they were from the same clan. Liu Zhang agreed to his proposal and had Fa Zheng sent to begin talks with Liu Bei. Not long after, along with Meng Da. Fa Zheng was ordered to lead several thousand soldiers to help Liu Bei in his defence of Jing. Fa Zheng afterwards was called back.

Around 211, when Liu Zhang received news that Cao Cao, the warlord who controlled the Han central government and the figurehead Emperor Xian, was planning to attack Zhang Lu, another warlord in the neighbouring Hanzhong Commandery, he became fearful that Cao Cao would attack Yi Province after defeating Zhang Lu. During this time, Zhang Song advised Liu Zhang to invite Liu Bei to lead his troops into Yi Province and help Liu Zhang deal with Zhang Lu. Zhang Song told him: "Cao Cao's armies are strong and without a match in the empire. If he was able to use Zhang Lu's grain stores and launch an invasion of Yi province, who could stop him." Liu Zhang answered that he was worried but without a plan. Zhang Song answered: "Liu Bei is of the same clan as you and he is an unstoppable rival of Cao Cao. He commands troops with talent. If we used him to conquer Zhang Lu, Zhang Lu would surely be defeated. With Zhang Lu vanquished, Yi province would be safe and even if Cao Cao were to come, he would be defeated."

Some time passed and Zhang Song again pressed Liu Zhang. :

Liu Zhang heeded Zhang Song's advice and ordered his subordinate Fa Zheng to lead 4,000 men to welcome Liu Bei into Yi Province, in addition to presenting Liu Bei with several precious gifts. Against the advice of Huang Quan who thought of the disadvantages of such a course and the remonstrances of the attendant Wang Lei (王累) from Guanghan (廣漢) who hanged himself at the city gate in sign of protest. However, Liu Zhang didn't listen to any of them and even ordered the different places to supply Liu Bei's army.

Liu Bei led thousands of his troops into Yi Province and met Liu Zhang at Fu County (涪縣; present-day Mianyang, Sichuan). He also met Zhang Song and Fa Zheng who privately disapproved of Liu Zhang's governance and looked at Liu Bei as a solution for a legitimate successor. When Liu Bei met them, he welcomed them warmly and treated them with kindness. He used this opportunity to learn more about crucial information about Yi Province such as geography, supplies and deployment of military forces. Zhang Song even drew a map of Yi Province and gave it to Liu Bei. As time passed, Zhang Song conceived the idea of betraying Liu Zhang and helping Liu Bei seize control of Yi Province from Liu Zhang, so he contacted Fa Zheng, who agreed to join him. With their help, Liu Bei learned all about Yi province. Liu Zhang invited Liu Bei to join him in Yi Province to capture Hanzhong Commandery before Cao Cao did.

Liu Bei led an expedition force of several ten thousands soldiers into Yi Province after leaving behind Zhuge Liang, Guan Yu, Zhang Fei and Zhao Yun to guard Jing Province. Liu Zhang welcomed Liu Bei, when they saw each other, both of them were friendly. Before this Zhang Song told Fa Zheng to report to Liu Bei, that with the counsellor Pang Tong backing, they could ambush Liu Zhang at the meeting spot. However Liu Bei thought that the plan was too hasty for such an important act.

In winter of 211-212, Fa Zheng, Zhang Song and Meng Da set into motion their plan but they worried that Liu Bei would leave. They said to him that now that success is near, how could he give up and leave. At this time, Zhang Song's brother Zhang Su (張肅), found out about his brother's plot and secret communications with Liu Bei. Afraid of being implicated, Zhang Su secretly reported his brother's plot to Liu Zhang, who had Zhang Song arrested and executed and ordered his officers guarding the passes to Chengdu to keep secret documents and letters to Liu Bei. When Liu Bei heard about Zhang Song's death, he exclaimed, "Junjiao killed my spy!"

Family
Zhang Song's elder brother Zhang Su (張肅) whose courtesy name was Junjiao (君矯) was also from Shu Commandery (蜀郡). When he was sent as an emissary to Cao Cao previously to Zhang Song, he impressed him and was appointed as Administrator of Guanghan (廣漢太守). Both brothers looked very different from each other as Zhang Su was a tall man with an imposing and majestuous appearance while Zhang Song was a rather short man who did not exercise restraint and was known as debauched. However, Zhang Song was also a very knowledgeable man with a good discernment hence he possessed talent and ability. When Liu Zhang sent him to Cao Cao, Cao Cao wasn't polite to him. But the master of records Yang Xiu deeply respected him. And even recommended Cao Cao to have Zhang Song joined his personal staff but Cao Cao didn't listen to him. When Yang Xiu showed him the military books that Cao Cao had written, Zhang Song quickly had all of them read and memorized them through and through. After this event, Yang Xiu esteemed him even more.

Zhang Biao (張表), whose courtesy name was Boda (伯達) was chosen to administer the south after Ma Zhong. At first, Zhang Biao was the son of Zhang Su, but when Liu Bei conquered Yi province, he refused to employ Zhang Su and hated him greatly for his role in Zhang Song's death. Since Zhang Song's children were killed by association with him when Liu Zhang discovered his intrigue, Liu Bei had Zhang Biao posthumously adopted by Zhang Song to continue his line.

In Romance of the Three Kingdoms
In the 14th-century historical novel Romance of the Three Kingdoms, Zhang Song is portrayed as a short, buck-toothed man with a short nose, who does not command respect for his ugly looks. In the novel, his courtesy name is Yongnian (永年).

Liu Zhang sends Zhang Song as an envoy to meet Cao Cao. He brings with him a map of Yi Province and hopes to present it to Cao Cao and aid him in conquering Yi Province from Liu Zhang. However, Cao Cao dislikes Zhang Song for his appearance and treats him rudely. In retaliation, Zhang Song makes sarcastic remarks to humiliate Cao Cao, who orders his men to beat up Zhang Song and chase him away.

Zhang Song is deeply upset by Cao Cao's attitude towards him so he leaves for Jing Province and meets Liu Bei along the way. Liu Bei treats Zhang Song like an honoured guest. Zhang Song is so impressed with Liu Bei's hospitality that he presents the map to Liu Bei and urges him to conquer Yi Province from Liu Zhang. He also introduces his colleagues Fa Zheng and Meng Da to Liu Bei and tells him that they will aid him in defeating Liu Zhang.

Zhang Song is executed by Liu Zhang after the latter discovers that he is plotting against him.

See also
 Lists of people of the Three Kingdoms

Notes

References

 Chen, Shou (3rd century). Records of the Three Kingdoms (Sanguozhi).
 Luo, Guanzhong (14th century). Romance of the Three Kingdoms (Sanguo Yanyi).
 Pei, Songzhi (5th century). Annotations to Records of the Three Kingdoms (Sanguozhi zhu).
 

2nd-century births
212 deaths
Liu Zhang and associates
Liu Bei and associates
Han dynasty politicians
People executed by the Han dynasty